Bucculatrix pomifoliella is a moth in the family Bucculatricidae. It was described by James Brackenridge Clemens in 1860 and is found in North America, where it has been recorded from Pennsylvania, Virginia, New Jersey, New York, Massachusetts, Maine, Ontario, Ohio, Tennessee, North Carolina, Missouri, Utah, Washington, British Columbia, Indiana, Manitoba, Quebec and West Virginia.

The wingspan is 7–7.5 mm. The forewings are creamy white, obscured by a slight to dense dark dusting of brown-tipped scales. The hindwings are pale to dark greyish ocherous. Adults have been recorded on wing from April to September. There are up to two generations per year.

The larvae feed on trees and shrubs in the family Rosaceae, including Prunus serotina, Amelanchier laevis and Physocarpus malvaceus. The larvae also feed on Malus species.  They mine the leaves of their host plant. The mine has the form of a fine linear mine. In the beginning, it follows the midrib, but then diverges from it. Older larvae live freely, feeding on a leaf and eating out irregular patches, but leaving the lower epidermis intact. Pupation takes place in a white cocoon, which is spun on a twig or other surface.

References

Natural History Museum Lepidoptera generic names catalog

Bucculatricidae
Leaf miners
Moths described in 1860
Taxa named by James Brackenridge Clemens
Moths of North America